The Sierra Madre ground warbler (Robsonius thompsoni) is a species of passerine bird in the family Locustellidae. It is endemic to the island of Luzon in the Philippines, where it is found in the northeastern and eastern foothills of the Sierra Madre. Its habitat is in tropical moist lowland and the lower reaches of tropical montane forest. Along with its closest relatives, the Cordillera ground warbler and the Bicol ground warbler, it is one of the most elusive birds in the country due to its extremely shy nature. While not officially threatened, its population is said to be declining due to habitat destruction through deforestation.

The Sierra Madre ground warbler feeds on insects and lives in tropical understories. It is a ground-walking songbird — rotund, with strong legs and weak wings — and it appears that it can barely fly. It tends to inhabit dense forest understories, where it feeds on insects.  The bird looks similar to the other two species of ground warblers on the island of Luzon, the Bicol ground warbler and the Cordillera ground warbler, and probably for this reason it was not earlier recognized as a separate species.

Description and taxonomy 
EBird describes the bird as "A medium-sized bird of the forest floor from the lowlands to low elevations in the mountains in northeastern Luzon. Fairly stout, with a pale lower bill, long legs, and large feet. Pale below, with a grayish, faintly scaled chest and brown under the base of the tail. Note rufous face and forehead with pale bare skin in front of the eye, brown upperparts with two dotted white wingbars, and chestnut flight feathers. Note the white throat with black speckling below and a thin black moustache stripe. Unmistakable. Song consists of a very high-pitched tseeee-sip tsee-wee!"  Its song is extremely high-pitched and it is difficult to locate the source of the sound in the forest — they always sound like they are far away, even when they are almost at your feet. 

The three species of ground warblers are similar in size, shape and in the coloration of their juvenile plumage, but they differ from one another in their adult plumage coloration. Since they are so alike they were always thought to be the same species, until a DNA test was conducted which proved they were multiple species It is differentiated from the Cordillera ground warbler and Bicol ground warbler by its ashy gray chest and the spotted markings on its chin and neck. 

The species was first described by the ornithologists Peter Hosner and colleagues in 2013 and given the binomial name Robsonius thompsoni. The specific epithet was chosen to honour the ornithologist Max C. Thompson. This species is placed in the genus Robsonius that was introduced by the English ornithologist Nigel J. Collar in 2006.

Behaviour and ecology 
It is a ground-walking songbird — rotund, with strong legs and weak wings — and it appears that it can barely fly.

Breeding 
Very little is known about the Sierra Madre ground warblers breeding method. The nest is mostly found on rock cliffs, and made of wet sticks, branches and leaves. The nest is dome-shaped with an entrance way. The dome is held up by twigs attached to the rock and mud that surrounds it.

Food and feeding 
The diet of the Sierra Madre ground warbler is primarily invertebrates; it has been sighted scouring forest floors for prey hidden under leaves.

Habitat and conservation status 
It is found in lowland moist and low montane dipterocarp forest in primary forest, secondary forest and forest edge up to 1,300 m. It is typically found on the forest floor among limestone outcrops, bamboo and mossy rocks. 

IUCN has assessed this bird as a Least-concern species.  The global population size has not been quantified, although it has been described as uncommon. However, it may be more common than suggested by field observations, owing to its secretive habits. Among the other Robsonius ground-warbles, the Sierra Madre ground warbler has the largest range.  

Despite not being threatened, the Sierra Madre mountain range has experienced large amounts of deforestation that continues at present and thus results in a declining population. This species' main threat is habitat loss due to wholesale clearance of forest habitats as a result of logging, agricultural conversion and mining activities occurring within the range.

It is found in two protected areas in the Northern Sierra Madre Natural Park and the Aurora Memorial National Park; however, like most areas in the Philippines protection is lax.

Conservation actions proposed include assessing the population size and establishing a monitoring programme to quantify trends; establishing its ability to persist in degraded habitats; identifying and assessing threats; and ensuring that the Northern Sierra Madre Natural Park and the Aurora Memorial National Park are more effectively protected.

References

Sierra Madre ground warbler
Sierra Madre ground warbler